Aimee Rose Palmer (born 25 July 2000) is an English footballer who plays as a midfielder for Bristol City in the FA Women's Championship. She has previously played for Manchester United and Sheffield United in the Championship, and has represented England at under-17, under-19 and under-21 level.

Club career

Bristol City 
Palmer broke into the first-team making her senior debut in the WSL 1 on 22 April 2017, as a substitute for Jasmine Matthews in a 3–1 loss to Reading. She went on to feature in three of Bristol's Spring Series games in 2017. This led to more first team opportunities in the 2017–18 season. On 12 October 2017, she made her season debut coming on as a 19th-minute substitute for Poppy Wilson in Bristol's 2–0 WSL Cup defeat by Tottenham. On 28 October, she made her first league start of the campaign, in a 5–0 defeat by Reading.

While training with Bristol City, Palmer studied for her A levels in psychology, biology and chemistry at SGS College and was named Student of the Year.

Manchester United

2018–19 season
On 1 July 2018, Palmer joined the newly-formed Manchester United to compete in the FA Women's Championship, reuniting with manager Willie Kirk who had been appointed assistant manager at United. She made her competitive debut for Manchester United, as a 61st minute substitute for Mollie Green, in a 2–0 League Cup defeat against Reading on 25 August. On 9 September, Palmer made her Championship debut in a 12–0 win against Aston Villa, coming on as a substitute in the 64th minute for Lauren James. She scored her first ever senior goal on the final day of United's title winning 2018–19 season in a 5–0 victory over Lewes.

2019–20 season: Loan to Sheffield United 
On 21 August 2019, Palmer joined Sheffield United in the FA Women's Championship on loan for the season. On 25 August, Palmer scored a brace and provided an assist on her debut as part of a 7–1 victory over Leicester City. On 23 January 2020, Manchester United recalled Palmer. At the time of her departure, Palmer ranked as Sheffield United's fourth-highest goalscorer across all competitions. She left Manchester United following the expiration of her contract at the end of the season.

Return to Bristol City
On 2 July 2020, Palmer rejoined Bristol City, signing a two-year contract with the club. She made her second debut in a 4–0 league loss to Everton.

Palmer was in the first team in January 2023 when Bristol won a 4-0 victory over Oxford United to join the 5th round of the women's FA cup.

International career 
In May 2017, Palmer traveled to the Czech Republic as part of the England under-17 squad to compete in the 2017 UEFA Women's Under-17 Championship. She scored in England's 2–1 group stage defeat by the Netherlands as the team failed to progress to the knockout stage.

On 3 April 2018, Palmer scored on her under-19 debut as England beat Israel 4–1 in an elite round qualifying game for the 2018 UEFA Women's Under-19 Championship. Four months later, in the opening round of qualifying for the 2019 tournament, Palmer scored braces in consecutive games as England eased past Malta and Croatia, 9–0 and 8–0 respectively. In January 2019, she captained the side at the Algarve Tournament. On 28 February 2019, Palmer scored England's goal in a 1–2 defeat to Spain in their opening match of the La Manga Tournament.

In July 2019, Palmer was named in the England squad for the 2019 UEFA Under-19 Championship in Scotland.

Career statistics

Club

Honours
Manchester United
 FA Women's Championship: 2018–19

References

External links 
 Profile at the Manchester United F.C. website
 
 

2000 births
Living people
People from Wymondham
English women's footballers
Manchester United W.F.C. players
Bristol City W.F.C. players
Women's Super League players
Sheffield United W.F.C. players
Women's association football midfielders
England women's under-21 international footballers